Days Canyon is a canyon in the Wasatch Range in eastern Utah County, Utah, United States.

Description
It has two tributaries of its own, Left Fork Days Canyon and Right Fork Days Canyon. The main canyon extends roughly southeast from the Right Fork Hobble Creek Canyon for about  before splitting.

The canyon was named for Abraham Day, an early settler that opened the Cherry Picnic area (now Cherry Campground) at the mouth of the canyon. A day use only hiking trail begins the Right Fork Hobble Creek Canyon and continues through Left Fork Days Canyon to connect with the trail in Kirkman Hollow (another tributary of the Right Fork Hobble Creek Canyon).

See also

 List of canyons and gorges in Utah

References

Canyons and gorges of Utah
Canyons and gorges of Utah County, Utah
Wasatch Range